Anoba pectinata is a species of moth of the family Erebidae. First described by Hampson, 1896.

References 

Erebidae
Insects described in 1896